EAH may refer to:

 5-epiaristolochene 1,3-dihydroxylase
 EAH Housing
 Einstein@Home
 Exercise-associated hyponatremia
 Ever After High